Thiemo de Bakker was the defending champion, but lost in the semifinals to Daniel Gimeno-Traver.

Daniel Gimeno-Traver won the title, defeating Thomas Schoorel in the final, 6–2, 6–4.

Seeds

Draw

Finals

Top half

Bottom half

References
 Main Draw
 Qualifying Draw

TEAN International - Singles
2013 Singles
2013 in Dutch tennis